Marquess of Heusden (Dutch: Markies van Heusden) is a high-ranking Dutch title of nobility retained by the Earl of Clancarty.

The 2nd Earl of Clancarty, an Anglo-Irish peer, was credited with resolving various border disputes in the Netherlands, Germany and Italy at the Congress of Vienna (1814 – 1815) and in his role as Ambassador to the Netherlands. For his service as ambassador to The Hague, he was raised into the Dutch nobility with the creation of the hereditary title Markies van Heusden (Marquess of Heusden) by King Willem I of the Netherlands (royal decree 8 July 1815 no. 14).

Nobility
The 2nd Earl of Clancarty and all his descendants belong to the Dutch nobility, in which all the descendant Earls have the title of Marquess of Heusden; the remainder of the descendants carry the Dutch honorific style of Jonkheer or Jonkvrouw.

Only two non-Dutch lineages living outside of the Netherlands have been raised into the Dutch nobility: the Le Poer Trench family and the Wellesley family, with the Duke of Wellington as the Prince of Waterloo.

List of Marquesses of Heusden (1815 - )
Richard Le Poer Trench, 1st Marquess of Heusden (1767–1837) since 1815
William Thomas Le Poer Trench, 2nd Marquess of Heusden (1803–1872) since 1837
Richard Somerset Le Poer Trench, 3rd Marquess of Heusden (1834–1891) since 1872
William Frederick Le Poer Trench, 4th Marquess of Heusden (1868–1929) since 1891
Richard Frederick John Donough Le Poer Trench, 5th Marquess of Heusden (1891–1971) since 1929
Greville Sydney Rocheforte Le Poer Trench, 6th Marquess of Heusden (1902–1975) since 1971
(William Francis) Brinsley Le Poer Trench, 7th Marquess of Heusden (1911–1995) since 1975
Nicholas Power Richard Le Poer Trench, 8th Marquess of Heusden (b. 1952) since 1995

There is no heir to the marquessate.

References

External links
Location of the fortified City of Heusden on the River Maas in North Brabant, Netherlands - website Google Maps

 
Heusden
Noble titles created for UK MPs
Noble titles created in 1815
Trench family